Calculating Visions: Kennedy, Johnson, and Civil Rights written by Mark Stern, was published in 1992 by Rutgers University Press. 

It is a commentary and evaluation of methods and techniques used by former Presidents John F. Kennedy and Lyndon B. Johnson in their support of Civil Rights. 

The author, Mark Stern, is a professor of Political Science at University of South Florida, and has written multiple essays, short critiques and articles about the subject of the book.

The book presents the idea that both Kennedy and Johnson were not very emotionally committed to the area and movement, although Johnson seems to have been more so than Kennedy, according to the book. This is demonstrated as the norm in politics, as most politicians, according to Stern, use crises and movements to advance their political stature and gain votes: “Candidates need policy proposals in order to gain votes”.

References
 Payne, Charles M. "Calculating Visions: Kennedy, Johnson, and Civil Rights (Book." Contemporary Sociology 22.1 (Jan. 1993): 73–74.Abstract: Reviews the book "Calculating Visions: Kennedy, Johnson, and Civil Rights," by Mark Stern.
 Tushnet, Mark. "Reviews of books: United States." American Historical Review 97.5 (n.d.): 1624. Abstract: Reviews the book `Calculating Visions: Kennedy, Johnson, and Civil Rights,' by Mark Stern.
 Brauer, Carl M. "Book reviews." Journal of American History 79.4 (n.d.): 1683–1684. Abstract: Reviews the book `Calculating Visions: Kennedy, Johnson, and Civil Rights,' by Mark Stern.
 Dierefield, Bruce J. "Book reviews." Journal of Southern History 59.3 (Aug. 1993): 585. Abstract: Reviews the book `Calculating Visions: Kennedy, Johnson, and Civil Rights,' by Mark Stern.
 Shabazz, Amilcar. "Book reviews." Southwestern Historical Quarterly 97.3 (Jan. 1994): 582. Abstract: Reviews the book `Calculating Visions: Kennedy, Johnson, and Civil Rights,' by Mark Stern.

Political books
1992 non-fiction books
Rutgers University Press books
Books about John F. Kennedy
Books about Lyndon B. Johnson